The R3 Lougheed Hwy is an express bus service with bus rapid transit elements in Metro Vancouver, British Columbia, Canada. Part of TransLink's RapidBus network, it travels along Lougheed Highway and connects Coquitlam, Port Coquitlam, Pitt Meadows, and Maple Ridge.

History 
On November 23, 2016, the Mayors' Council and TransLink's board of directors approved the first phase of the 10-Year Vision, which included provisions for new B-Line routes (including the Lougheed Highway B-Line). On July 23, 2019, the route was officially rebranded the R3 Lougheed Hwy RapidBus. The R3 began service on January 6, 2020.

Route description

The R3 Lougheed Hwy mainly travels along Lougheed Highway (Highway 7); in Maple Ridge, it also travels along 226th Street.

Stops
 Coquitlam Central Station – Western terminus; connections to Millennium Line and the West Coast Express
 Westwood Street
 Shaughnessy Street
 Ottawa Street
 Harris Road
 203rd Street                                                                                                  
 Laity Street 
Haney Place Exchange – Eastern terminus

See also 
R1 King George Blvd
R2 Marine Dr
R4 41st Ave
R5 Hastings St
 List of bus routes in Metro Vancouver

References

External links 

 TransLink

RapidBus (TransLink)
2020 establishments in British Columbia
Transport in Coquitlam
Port Coquitlam
Pitt Meadows
Maple Ridge, British Columbia